| past_members     = Nassim & Sijal & Hidden & Wilson & Sohrab MJ & Alireza JJ
| background       = group_or_band
| origin           = Tehran, Iran
| genre            = 
| years_active     = 2002–2014; 2020–present
}}
Zedbazi is an Iranian hip hop band, formed by longtime friends Saman Wilson and Mehrad Hidden and later joined by Sohrab MJ, Sijal, Alireza JJ and Nassim.
In a 2022 concert, the founder of the group (Saman Wilson) announced the group's two new members, Sepehr Khalse and Behzad Leito. 

They are known as the pioneers of gangsta rap in Iran. The band's most famous song, called Tabestoon Kootahe, is largely credited as the first widely heard piece of Persian Rap.

The band was officially suspended in October 2014 due to personal reasons. On May 20, 2020, Zedbazi announced they are back on their Instagram page. Shortly after, on June 10 2020, they released two singles named Yakh (یخ; meaning ice), a diss track to Moltafet band and Hichkas and Bache Mahal (بچه محل; meaning) talking about their past path to becoming famous from the beginning of Persian Rap in Iran. The songs were released on Radio Javan.

History

Foundation
The Foundation of the band dates back to early 2002. It was started up by Saman Rezapour (Saman Wilson) and Mehrad Mostofi-Rad (Mehrad Hidden), who were friends in a high school in Tehran. Despite having prior experiences in music, the formation of the band with a hip hop style was motivated by Saman's cover of Eminem's Without Me, which was performed with matched vulgar lyrics written in Persian. After moving to London, they met Sohrab Mostafavi (Sohrab MJ) in a summer school. He joined the band after collaborating on Kal Kal ( – , "Argue"), a cover of D12's Rap Game.

The band's early members had their first collaboration with Siavash Jalali (Sijal) and Alireza Jazayeri (Alireza JJ) on the track Berim Faza ( – , "(Let's) Go to Space"), produced by Alireza JJ in 2005. Siavash and Alireza were best friends in Paris, where they had also met Nassim Parize, an Iranian finalist at the French reality TV show Star Academy (Season 5) with her twin sister, Neissa.

The three future band members officially joined Zedbazi by releasing Tabestoon Kootahe ( – , "Summer is Short") in September 2007. They brought a new style into the band, as Mehrad Hidden remarks in Ardeshir Ahmadi's Zedbazi Documentary. "The formula they brought was different than ours. Our formula was necessary for the inception, theirs was necessary for the continuation."

The name Zedbazi ( – ) consists of the words zed ("Z", the first letter of Zākhār meaning mate) and bāzi ("play"). It is what Saman and his friends used to call each other in high school, and according to the band, it can mean both "an old and close friend" and "an old-fashioned and fusty person"; it depends on the purpose. Therefore, Zedbazi can be translated as "the Zakhar acts."

Popularity

Zedbazi emerged at the same time as Hichkas, and rapidly garnered huge popularity among the Iranian youth due to their controversial lyrics, littered with profanities, depictions of sexual encounters and drug use.

"Tabestoon Kootahe" is considered Zedbazi's most popular song, which was released in September 2007. It is about "the bittersweet feeling" of summertime in Iran.

Temporary Dissolution
In October 2014, the band announced a separation between the members. It was due to some internal disagreements. Saman Wilson, who had not been performing on the band's songs after Tabestoon Kootahe, returned and joined Mehrad Hidden, forming a new band named Bozorg ( – , "Great"). Alireza JJ, Sijal, and Nassim decided to work together, and Sohrab MJ worked alone.

Return
Zedbazi announced their return to Persian Rap in June 2020 by releasing two tracks (Yakh and Bache Mahal).

Discography

Zedbazi
First single track of this band is "Diss ajili" or in English "Nut diss" and it published in 2003 by Saman Wilson and just he singed in this track. Also this track main melody is Without Me of Eminem.

Until 2012, the band had yet to release an album, and their songs were provided as singles.

Their first studio album, Zakhar Nameh ( – , "The Zakhar Book"), was released on June 4, 2012. All of the band members, except Saman Wilson, were involved in the album, featuring Hichkas, Behzad Leito, and Arash Dara.

Alireza JJ, Sijal and Nassim
On July 28, 2014, the album Pir Shodim Vali Bozorg Na ( – , "Got Old But Didn't Grow-Up") was released, including only three members of the band (Alireza JJ, Sijal and Nassim) and without the record label of Zedbazi. It was composed by Alireza JJ and DJ AFX and included Behzad Leito, Paya, Erfan, Sepehr Khalse, Sina Mafee, Magico, and Cornellaa as featured artists.

Bozorg
The album Bozorg: Vol. 2 ( – ), presented by Bozorg (Saman Wilson and Mehrad Hidden), was released on February 27, 2015; with Sohrab MJ, Arash Dara, Tara Salahi, Kiarash, and Siamak as featured artists. It was composed by Mehrad Hidden, Arash Dara, and DJ Rassek and mastered by Iman Tanha; including 19 tracks. The 2 other volumes are said to be released in the future.

Mehrad Hidden
The album Toonel vol.1 (تونل جلد 1), presented by Mehrad Hidden was released on February 2, 2017; with Saman Wilson, Sohrab MJ, Zakhmi, Arash Dara, Sijal and Canis as featured artists and DJ Rassek as a featured composer. Toonel was Composed/produced by Mehrad Hidden and Canis and mastered by Iman Tanha; including 11 tracks in the genre of Rock and Hip-Hop, sponsored by Bose and realized on Spotify, SoundCloud, and Radio Javan.

The album Sefr (صفر), presented by Mehrad Hidden was released on November 11, 2018; with Arash Rassek as co-producer, Iman Tanha as mix and mastering engineer and Imane as the cover artist; including 9 tracks in the genre of Rock and realized on Spotify, SoundCloud, and Radio Javan.

The EP album Salakh (سلاخ), presented by Mehrad Hidden was released on February 27, 2019; including 6 tracks in the genre of New age and realized on Apple Music and Spotify.

The album Toonel vol.2 (تونل جلد 2), presented by Mehrad Hidden was released on August 14, 2020; with Pozx, Arash Dara, Shayea, Saman Wilson,  Zakhmi,  Canis, Amirali, Sohrab MJ, Tara Salahi, Sijal as featured artists. Toonel vol.2 was Composed/produced by Canis and mastered by Shung; including 14 tracks in the genre of Rock and Hip-Hop, in association with Tenzu Music and realized on Apple Music, Spotify, and Radio Javan.

The EP album Alavis presented by Mehrad Hidden and HEEN was realised on February 17, 2021; including 2 trackes in the genre Electronic and realized on Apple Music, Spotify, and SoundCloud.

First 2022 he released an album collaborating with Moody Mousavi called Zoozanaghe containing 14 tracks on Apple Music, Spotify

Sohrab MJ
Sohrab MJ released his first album, Yeksin, on September 20, 2017. Alireza JJ is responsible for the production of the album while producing four tracks, and Khashayar Sr producing the remaining track. Yeksin Includes five tracks with guest artists from Zedbazi (every member excluding Saman Wilson) and Behzad Leito.

Sohrab MJ released his second album, Zakhare Asli, on April 1, 2021. Alisam, Jawaheri, Ali K, Tazad, Cepehri, Mehrad Hidden, Arman Miladi, Alireza JJ, and Mr.MP are responsible for the production of the album. Zakhare Asli Includes ten tracks and a bonus track (only for physical packs) with Saman Wilson, Mehrad Hidden, Ali K, Sijal, Amir Tataloo, Arash Saretan, Hoomaan, Sepehr 3NIK, Sepehr Khalse, Sina Mafee, Alireza JJ, Sayan YO, Tarin, I.Da, Maslak, and Merzhak as guest artists.

References

Iranian hip hop
Iranian hip hop musicians
Iranian rappers
Iranian rock music
Iranian musical groups
Iranian singer-songwriters
Rap rock groups
Musical groups established in 2002